Tom Garner (born July 18, 1961) is an American professional golfer who played on the PGA Tour and the Nationwide Tour.

Garner joined the PGA Tour in 1987, earning his Tour card through qualifying school. He struggled in his rookie year on Tour and was unable to retain his card. He joined the Nationwide Tour in 1990 where he won the Ben Hogan Central New York Classic. The following year he finished in a tie for second twice while recording four top-5 finishes. He picked up his second victory on Tour in 1992 at the Ben Hogan Bakersfield Open. He rejoined the PGA Tour in 1994, earning his card through qualifying school but struggled and returned to the Nationwide Tour where he would play until 1998.

Garner has worked as an instructor at the Arnold Palmer Golf Academy at Bay Hill Club and Lodge in Orlando, Florida since 1997.

Professional wins (3)

Ben Hogan Tour wins (2)

Other wins (1)
1997 North Florida PGA Section Championship

Results in major championships

CUT = missed the half-way cut
Note: Garner only played in the U.S. Open.

See also
1986 PGA Tour Qualifying School graduates
1993 PGA Tour Qualifying School graduates

External links

American male golfers
Alabama Crimson Tide men's golfers
PGA Tour golfers
Golfers from Florida
Sportspeople from Fort Lauderdale, Florida
1961 births
Living people